A commandery is an administrative district and may refer to:

 Commandery, an administrative level of a European military order
 Commandery, also jun, an historical administrative level of China
 The Commandery, an historic building in the city of Worcester, England
 A division found within the York Rite of Freemasonry